The 2011–12 Championnat LNA is the 11th season. The regular season started in October 2011.

Participants 
Starwings Basket Regio Basel
BC Boncourt Red Team
Benetton Fribourg Olympic
Les Lions de Geneve
Lugano Tigers
BBC Monthey
SAM Massagno Basket
BBC Nyon
SAV Vacallo Basket

Regular season

 SAV Vacallo Basket lost 2 points by withdrawing his game on day 5

External links 
 

Championnat LNA seasons
Swiss
basketball
basketball